Carabus lusitanicus is a species of beetle from family Carabidae that is endemic to Iberia. It has three subspecies, C. l. breuningi, C. l. brevis, and C. l. lusitanicus.

References

External links
Carabus lusitanicus extracting genitalia

lusitanicus
Beetles described in 1801